Nikolay Petrovich Brusentsov (7 February 1925 in Kamenskoe, Ukrainian SSR – 4 December 2014) was a computer scientist, most famous for having built a (balanced) ternary computer, Setun, together with Sergei Sobolev in 1958.
In 1970 he designed Setun 70, implementing principles which were later proposed for the RISC architecture independently. He died on 4 December 2014.

See also
 List of pioneers in computer science

References

1925 births
2014 deaths
People from Kamianske
Russian computer scientists
Russian inventors
Soviet computer scientists
Soviet military personnel of World War II
Academic staff of Moscow State University